The Autry Museum of the American West is a museum in Los Angeles, California, dedicated to exploring an inclusive history of the American West. Founded in 1988, the museum presents a wide range of exhibitions and public programs, including lectures, film, theater, festivals, family events, and music, and performs scholarship, research, and educational outreach. It has two sites and attracts about 150,000 visitors annually.

In 2013, it extensively redesigned and renovated the Irene Helen Jones Parks Gallery of Art and the Gamble Firearms Gallery in its main building. In its related opening exhibit for the Parks Gallery, Art of the West, the new organization enabled material to be presented in relation to themes rather than chronology, and paintings were shown next to crafts, photography, video and other elements in new relationships.

Locations
Griffith Park 4700 Western Heritage Way, Los Angeles, California, 90027
Mt. Washington, 234 Museum Drive, Los Angeles, California, 90065 (Southwest Museum of the American Indian building and ethnobotanical garden, open on Saturdays, 10:00 a.m. to 4:00 p.m.)

Elements
The Autry was established in 1988 by actor and businessman Gene Autry as "Gene Autry Western Heritage Museum", dedicated to exploring and sharing the comprehensive story of the American West and its multiple cultures, as well as further interpreting the West’s significance. Its Griffith Park collection includes 21,000 paintings, sculptures, costumes, textiles, firearms, tools, toys, musical instruments, and other objects. The museum contains contemporary and historical exhibitions, year-round programs for children, intellectual forums, and the Native Voices at the Autry performing arts series.

Since 1995, Native Voices at the Autry has been the only existing equity theater solely focused on producing new works by Native American, Alaska Native, and First Nation playwrights. Randy Reinholz, a member of Oklahoma's Choctaw Nation, and his wife Jean Bruce Scott have run the program for 20 years. Native Voices has produced over 34 full productions, gone on over 20 tours, with 23 new play festivals and 13 Native playwrights. This program is a crucial part of the Autry's mission to promote art history and cultures of the American West.

The museum is located in Griffith Park directly across from the Los Angeles Zoo. The 4,000-square foot Parks Gallery was renovated in 2013 and has been organized into three theme areas: Religion and Ritual, Land and Landscape, Migration and Movement. The main location also contains two mini galleries with revolving exhibits. These enable flexible curating of the museum's extensive materials: paintings can be placed near textiles, photographs, pottery and videos. The spaces can also be used for more flexible programming.

The Gamble Firearms Gallery also was renovated in 2013. It now shows more of the context and place of firearms in the Old West; curators grouped firearms by themes: "hunting and trapping, the impact of technology on firearms, the conservation movement and the West in popular culture." The Firearms Gallery is part of the larger Western Frontiers: Stories of Fact and Fiction Gallery.

The Autry's Southwest Museum of the American Indian Collection of Native American art is one of the most significant museums dedicated to Native culture in the United States, second only to the Smithsonian Institution National Museum of the American Indian. The 238,000-piece collection includes 14,000 baskets, 10,000 ceramic items, 6,300 textiles and weavings, and more than 1,100 pieces of jewelry. It represents work by indigenous peoples from Alaska to South America, with an emphasis on cultures of California and the Southwestern United States.
The Library and Archives of the Autry includes the collections of the Braun Research Library and the Autry Library. It is a research enterprise that supports scholarly work in Western history and the arts. In 2002, the Women of the West Museum of Colorado merged with the Autry Museum. This has broadened the scholarly and educational emphasis to include gender issues and women's experiences in the American West.

From 2004 to 2015, it was known as the "Autry National Center of the American West”. However, in October 2015, the museum began using the name "Autry Museum of the American West" to emphasize its "principal activities as a museum."

References

Further reading
"Your guide to Gene Autry, America's Favorite Singing Cowboy," pamphlet from the Autry Museum of the American West
"Pocket guide: Explore the past, present, & future of the American West," pamphlet from the Autry Museum of the American West

External links

Autry Museum Website
Past Productions: Native Voices at the Autry

Museums in Los Angeles
Griffith Park
American West museums in California
Native American museums in California
Art museums and galleries in Los Angeles
History museums in California
Women's museums in California
Museums established in 1988
Organizations established in 1988
1988 establishments in California
Native American arts organizations
Native Americans in Los Angeles
Gene Autry